The Dr KK Mohammed Koya Sea Cucumber Conservation Reserve is the first sea cucumber conservation area in the world, announced following reports of smuggling of sea cucumbers and other vulnerable species for trade in East Asia. It is located in the Cheriyapani Reef in the Indian Union Territory of Lakshadweep. It was formed in 2020 and covers an area of 239 km2. Together with the Attakoya Thangal Marine Conservation Reserve (344 km2) and the PM Sayeed Marine Birds Conservation reserve (62 km2), it forms a marine protected area (MPA) of 685 km2. 

In India, the sea cucumber is protected under the Schedule I of the Wildlife Protection Act, 1972, according to which the sea cucumbers cannot be transported for commercial use. In 2002, the Environmental ministry of India banned the commercial harvesting of sea cucumbers.

See also
PM Sayeed Marine Birds Conservation Reserve
Nilgiri Biosphere Reserve

References

Protected areas of India
Tourism in Lakshadweep
Nature conservation in India
Wildlife conservation in India
Biodiversity
Holothuroidea
2020 establishments in Lakshadweep